Selenis Leyva is an American actress. She is known for her role as Gloria Mendoza in the Netflix comedy-drama series Orange Is the New Black (2013–19), and also starred on the Disney+ comedy-drama series Diary of a Future President (2020–21).

Life and career
Leyva was born and raised in The Bronx. She is of Cuban and Dominican descent. She has appeared in a number of Off-Broadway productions. On television, Leyva had a recurring role of Detective Mariluz Rivera in Law & Order, and also appeared in different roles on the show and on Law & Order: Special Victims Unit. She has guest-starred on Third Watch, The Sopranos, The Good Wife, Girls, and Elementary.

In 2013, Leyva began starring as Gloria Mendoza, a Latina leader in the jail, in the Netflix comedy-drama series Orange Is the New Black. Her character was recurring for the first two seasons and she was promoted to series regular in Season 3.  Along with cast, she received three Screen Actors Guild Award for Outstanding Performance by an Ensemble in a Comedy Series. She also received ALMA Award for Outstanding Special Achievement in Television in 2014. The series ended in 2019, after seven seasons. During her time in Orange Is the New Black, Leyva co-starred opposite Viola Davis and Catalina Sandino Moreno in the 2016 courtroom drama film Custody directed and written by James Lapine, and played Monica Warren in the 2017 superhero film Spider-Man: Homecoming. In 2018, she had a supporting role in the Netflix miniseries Maniac.

In 2019, Leyva was cast in the Disney+ comedy-drama series Diary of a Future President produced by Gina Rodriguez. The series premiered on January 17, 2020 and was cancelled in December 2021.

Books 
Leyva is the co-author, with her sister Marizol, of the book My Sister: How One Sibling's Transition Changed Us Both, which was published by Bold Type Books in March 2020.

Personal life
Leyva has one daughter, Alina. She is a supporter of the LGBT community and revealed in June 2015 that her sister Marizol is transgender.

Filmography

Film

Television

References

External links

American television actresses
American film actresses
American people of Dominican Republic descent
American people of Cuban descent
American stage actresses
Hispanic and Latino American actresses
Living people
21st-century American actresses
20th-century American actresses
Entertainers from the Bronx
Year of birth missing (living people)